The 1985–86 Utah Utes men's basketball team represented the University of Utah as a member of the Western Athletic Conference during the 1985-86 season. Head coach Lynn Archibald would lead the Utes to a tie for the WAC regular season title and an NCAA tournament appearance.

Roster

Schedule and results

|-
!colspan=9 style=| Regular Season

|-
!colspan=9 style=| WAC Tournament

|-
!colspan=9 style=| NCAA Tournament

References

Utah Utes men's basketball seasons
Utah
Utah
Utah Utes
Utah Utes